Stephanie Berto (born March 13, 1953 in Vancouver) is a retired female track and field athlete, who represented Canada at the 1968 Summer Olympics in the women's 100 metres and 4 × 100 m relay, while becoming the youngest member of the Olympic team at age 15. Berto won a 100/200 metres sprint double at the Canadian Track and Field Championships in 1971. She also won both those events at the WAAA Championships that same year.

At 16, she captured a bronze medal in 100 meters and a silver medal in the 4 x 100 meter relay at the 1969 Pacific Conference Games in Tokyo, Japan. She won a bronze medal at the 1970 British Commonwealth Games in Edinburgh, Scotland as a member of the 4 x 100 meter relay team.  She claimed the gold medal in the women's 200 metres event at the 1971 Pan American Games in Cali, Colombia, and silver in the 100 metres.

National titles
Canadian Track and Field Championships
100 m: 1971
200 m: 1971

See also
List of 100 metres national champions (women)

References

1953 births
Living people
Athletes from Vancouver
Canadian female sprinters
Olympic track and field athletes of Canada
Athletes (track and field) at the 1968 Summer Olympics
Commonwealth Games bronze medallists for Canada
Commonwealth Games medallists in athletics
Athletes (track and field) at the 1970 British Commonwealth Games
Pan American Games gold medalists for Canada
Pan American Games silver medalists for Canada
Pan American Games medalists in athletics (track and field)
Athletes (track and field) at the 1971 Pan American Games
Medalists at the 1971 Pan American Games
Olympic female sprinters
Medallists at the 1970 British Commonwealth Games